Welda is an unincorporated community in Anderson County, Kansas, United States.  As of the 2020 census, the population of the community and nearby areas was 149.

History
Welda was platted in 1873, soon after the railroad was extended to that point in 1870. The first post office in Welda was established in 1874 and was probably named for Welda in Germany.

The railroad tracks in Welda have since been converted to a rail trail. The trail is part of the Prairie Spirit Trail State Park.

Geography

Demographics

For statistical purposes, the United States Census Bureau has defined Welda as a census-designated place (CDP).

Education
The community is served by Garnett USD 365 public school district, and operates Mont Ida Elementary School in Welda and Anderson County Junior-Senior High School in Garnett.

Welda schools were closed through school unification. The Welda High School mascot was Welda Pirates.

References

Further reading

External links
 Anderson County maps: Current, Historic, KDOT

Census-designated places in Anderson County, Kansas
Census-designated places in Kansas